Aardram is a 1992 Indian Malayalam film, directed by Suresh Unnithan, starring Murali, Sunitha and Urvashi in the lead roles.

Cast

References

External links

1992 films
1990s Malayalam-language films